Martín Lousteau (born 8 December 1970) is an Argentine economist and politician of the Radical Civic Union. He is National Senator for Buenos Aires.

He was Minister of Economy under the administration of Cristina Fernández de Kirchner, from December 2007 to April 2008. At the age of 37, he was the youngest person to occupy this office in more than five decades. 

Lousteau served as the Argentine Ambassador to the United States from 2015 to 2017. In 2017, Lousteau joined the UCR but was not part of Cambiemos in Argentine Congress.

From 2013 to 2019, he was a National Deputy, representing Buenos Aires. He resigned his bench at the Chamber of Deputies to be sworn in as Senator on 10 December 2019.

Early career
Lousteau was born in Buenos Aires. He graduated from Colegio Nacional de Buenos Aires. He is a Licentiate in Economics (graduated summa cum laude from the Universidad de San Andrés), and a Master of Science in Economics (at the London School of Economics). He taught as a postgraduate professor at the Universidad Torcuato Di Tella, and as graduate professor at the Universidad de San Andrés.

He is the author of Sin Atajos (No Shortcuts, 2005), a history of Argentina's economic crises, with Javier González Fraga; and Hacia un Federalismo Solidario (Towards a Cooperative Federalism), as well as specialized works and journalistic articles that have been published in Argentina and abroad. Lousteau had also been a tennis instructor (which he quit because of an injury), and worked as a war correspondent in Afghanistan for the magazines El Planeta Urbano and La Razón before the September 11 attacks.

Lousteau served as chief economist and later director of APL Economía, a consulting firm founded by former Central Bank President Alfonso Prat-Gay, and went on to hold various public offices as well as positions in the private sector. He was appointed Adviser to the President of the Central Bank of Argentina in 2003, for whom he designed a bank matching scheme for the payment of the discount window loans; and served in the Central Bank's Committee on Monetary Policy until 2004). He was appointed by Governor Felipe Solá as Minister of Production of Buenos Aires Province in 2005, and late that year was named Chairman of the Bank of the Province of Buenos Aires and of its parent company, the BAPRO Group, where he served from 2005 until his designation as Economy Minister in December 2007. He later co-founded a business consulting firm, LCG, with Gastón Rossi.

Minister of Economy

Lousteau was the first minister of economy of Cristina Fernández de Kirchner. There was a dispute in the cabinet at the time between Julio de Vido, Ricardo Jaime and Guillermo Moreno, and Alberto Fernández, Graciela Ocaña, Jorge Taiana and Carlos Tomada. Lousteau sided with Alberto Fernández, as he did not share the economic views of De Vido and Moreno. Fernández had promised him that both of them would be removed from government in a short time. Lousteau wrote a report for the president on the figures of the national economy, praising several aspects of the tenure of Néstor Kirchner, but warning about the growing inflation. This report was dismissed by Néstor Kirchner, who did not have an actual office but remained an influential figure. He also proposed to gradually reduce the subsidies to energy consumption, to eventually abandon the fixed price system established during the 2001 crisis. Cristina Kirchner did not support his proposal.

The salient feature of his tenure was the controversy surrounding his decision to increase soybean export taxes, which were previously fixed at 35%, and to have them fluctuate in line with global prices for the crop. This has been claimed as the major cause of the protests in the Argentine countryside which took place in early 2008. Lousteau was heavily involved in talks with farmers' leaders but was later sidelined.

Lousteau was rumored as early as two months into his tenure to have declared his intention to resign as a result of disputes with fellow ministers, particularly Commerce Secretary Guillermo Moreno. He denied he would resign; but there was nevertheless continued speculation on his resignation or replacement in the wake of the agrarian crisis. Lousteau resigned on 24 April 2008, with the tax agency chief Carlos Fernández replacing him.

According to The Wall Street Journal, his brief tenure was clouded from the outset by interference from former President Néstor Kirchner's allies. Lousteau's policy initiatives often seemed to be eclipsed by those of Commerce Secretary Guillermo Moreno, a Kirchner loyalist described as "the administration's price policeman."

Later work
Following his dismissal Lousteau contributed a weekly opinion column for the conservative daily La Nación and published two best-selling books on economic theory and history, Economía 3-D (2011) and Otra vuelta a la economía (2012). He received a Yale World Fellowship in 2012.

Politics in Buenos Aires

Lousteau joined the UNEN coalition, led by the centrist UCR, and was nominated to their City of Buenos Aires party list for Congress in the 2013 mid-term elections. He was one of five UNEN candidates elected to Congress for the City of Buenos Aires; but ongoing differences with caucus leader Elisa Carrió led Lousteau to form his own faction (Suma + UNEN), joined by UNEN Congressmen relying in grassroots action in the UCR. 

He ran for mayor in 2015 backed by centre-left coalition called ECO (Energía Ciudadana Organizada), and was narrowly defeated by Horacio Rodríguez Larreta. In these elections, PRO was stronger in wealthier northern Buenos Aires, while ECO was stronger in the southern, poorer neighborhoods of the city.

He was appointed ambassador of Argentina to the United States by president Mauricio Macri in 2016, but he resigned the following year to run for National Deputy in the 2017 Argentine mid-term elections. 

In 2017 mid-term elections, Lousteau ran heading the Evolución, which included the Radical Civic Union and the Socialist Party. Despite coming in third with 12.3% of the vote, he and Carla Carrizo became National Deputies due to Argentina's proportional representation electoral system.

Personal life 
Martín Lousteau married television actress Carla Peterson in New Haven, Connecticut, in September 2011, and the couple had a son in January 2013, whom they called Gaspar Lousteau.

Written books
 Hacia un federalismo solidario (2003)
 Sin atajos (2005)
 Economía 3D: una nueva dimension para tus preguntas de siempre (2011)
 Otra vuelta a la economía (2012)
 Debajo del agua (2019)

References

Bibliography
 

1970 births
Living people
People from Buenos Aires
Argentine people of French descent
Argentine Ministers of Finance
Alumni of the London School of Economics
Yale University fellows
Members of the Argentine Senate for Buenos Aires
Members of the Argentine Chamber of Deputies elected in Buenos Aires
Argentine agnostics
Ambassadors of Argentina to the United States
Argentine social democrats
Argentine political writers
Chevening Scholars